Livraghi is a surname of Italian origin. Notable people with the surname include: 

 Giancarlo Livraghi, Italian writer
 Giovanni Livraghi, Italian soldier
 Roberto Livraghi, Italian composer
 Virginio Livraghi, Italian comic strip artist and illustrator

Italian-language surnames